The Call of the Klondike is a 1926 American silent Western film directed by Oscar Apfel and starring Gaston Glass, Dorothy Dwan and Earl Metcalfe.

Cast
 Gaston Glass as Dick Norton 
 Dorothy Dwan as Violet Winter 
 Earl Metcalfe as Mortimer Pearson 
 Sam Allen as Burt Kenney 
 William Lowery as Owen Harkness 
 Olin Francis as Tim Dolan 
 Harold Holland as Downing 
 Jimmy Aubrey as Bowery Bill

References

External links
 

1926 films
1926 Western (genre) films
Films directed by Oscar Apfel
Rayart Pictures films
American black-and-white films
Silent American Western (genre) films
1920s English-language films
1920s American films